Poetic Justice is the fourth solo studio album by English singer-songwriter Steve Harley, which was released by Transatlantic on 26 August 1996.

Background
Harley wrote much of the new material for Poetic Justice while on tour with his band Cockney Rebel, which he reformed and began touring with again in 1989. As his first album since 1992's Yes You Can, Harley recorded Poetic Justice  at Berry House Studios in Ardingly, Sussex, with a number of musicians, including Nick Pynn, Phil Beer, Thomas Arnold, Ian Nice, Andrew Brown and Paul Francis. He told the Stockport Times in 1996, "It's my first album for four years so it's like a new beginning. It has blue and dark moments but then so has my life. Some of the songs may appear quite gloomy but I find it optimistic. It's my most confident set of lyrics ever. I've never made a record like this, where I can come away and I genuinely want to sing and play it live."

Speaking of his songwriting during this period of his career, Harley told The Birmingham Post in 1998, "In the Cockney Rebel days I was perhaps more detached as a songwriter than I am now. When you've had kids you change, but I'm still a terribly romantic animal. What I'm finding as I get older is that the songs allow me to express my sense of romance. Those who come to the concerts don't seem to mind, in fact many of them say Poetic Justice is their favourite album."

In 2002, Harley spoke of songwriting and Poetic Justice in an interview with Perfect Sound Forever. He said,

Song information
Poetic Justice features seven new songs, three covers, and a 'live in the studio' re-recording of "Riding the Waves (For Virginia Woolf)", a song which originally appeared on Harley's 1978 debut solo album Hobo with a Grin. "That's My Life in Your Hands" was written by Harley and Hugh Nicholson. The song originated as "Starlight Jingles", which was first recorded by Nicholson's band Blue during their sessions at Los Angeles between 1979–82, and later by Radio Heart for their self-titled 1987 album. Harley approached Nicholson to rewrite the lyrics and record his own version of the song.

"The Last Time I Saw You" received its debut live performance on 29 April 1994 at the Mick Ronson Memorial Concert at the Hammersmith Odeon in London. This live version, along with a performance of "Make Me Smile (Come Up and See Me)", later appeared on the 2001 compilation The Mick Ronson Memorial Concert.

The album's three covers include Jimmy Ruffin's "What Becomes of the Broken-Hearted?", Bob Dylan's "Love Minus Zero-No Limit" and Van Morrison's "Crazy Love". In a 1996 interview with Birmingham Evening Mail, Harley said, "I didn't need the help of other songwriters. The reason there are three cover versions is because I've reached the stage where I'm genuinely at ease with myself, whatever talent I've got. I've done some covers on stage but I only ever pick ones I wish I'd written myself. 'What Becomes of the Broken Hearted', for example, is a classic piece of writing." In a 1997 interview with Smiler, Harley added, "There's a lot of people who are quite unhappy with the covers that I've done on my new album, so I'm thinking I won't bother doing any again. My audience think I've run out of ideas if I only write eight [songs] out of eleven."

Release
Poetic Justice was released on CD by Transatlantic Records, a division of Castle Communications, on 26 August 1996.

No singles were released from the album, despite Harley's interest in releasing "That's My Life in Your Hands", "What Becomes of the Broken-Hearted?" and "The Last Time I Saw You". In his interview with Smiler, Harley commented, "They should have released 'The Last Time I Saw You' or 'That's My Life in Your Hands' – they would have got a lot of airplay – not Radio One – but a good plugger these days gets people like me on all those "gold" stations or Virgin – they'll all play it, and even if it was only a turntable hit, I'd have liked that, but record companies now are run by accountants. It's hard to get anyone to talk sense." In response to Robson & Jerome reaching the UK number one spot in 1996 with their own version of "What Becomes of the Broken-Hearted?", Harley added, "I'd recorded it long before they turned up. We were saying to the record company, I'd done this as a single, and they hadn't got a bloody clue. Three months later it was being played by them."

A re-issue of the album was released by Castle Music Ltd on 7 October 2002. Another re-issue, as a digi-pack CD, followed on 20 September 2010 by Repertoire Records, under license from Comeuppance Ltd. In 2010–11, Sanctuary Fontana made the album available as a digital download on sites such as iTunes.

Promotion
In September and October 1996, Steve Harley & Cockney Rebel embarked on the UK 19-date Poetic Justice Tour. The album was also advertised in various music magazines, including Mojo and Q. Harley was disappointed in Transatlantic's lack of promotion for Poetic Justice and the album's failure to reach a wide audience. He told The Birmingham Post in 1998, "You can only do your best. When you are someone like me who spends two years writing the songs and they come from the heart and then you find there's no serious marketing campaign for the product it's pretty depressing. My manager is in the process of discussing buying it back so we can re-release it."

Critical reception

On its release, High Fidelity News and Record Review wrote, "Something about Harley has him classified, historically, with rock's assholes, but this latest solo almost redeems him. His first in five years contains a cluster of originals and three seemingly out-of-place covers which actually work in the context of his own songs." Simon Evans of The Birmingham Post noted Harley's voice was "less mannered" and the arrangements "less grandiose" than in his Cockney Rebel days, but felt there are "flashes of the old Harley" in the "aching, regretful" "Two Damn'd Lies" and "All in a Life's Work". He believed Cockney Rebel's "faded bohemianism" was "best captured" on the "sumptuous" version of "Love Minus Zero/No Limit" and described the "lovely" "The Last Time I Saw You" as a song which "ranks alongside Harley's very best". Evans also noted the influence of Bob Dylan across the album, writing, "Dylan's presence hangs heavy, not just in Harley's poetic conceits but also on the Blonde on Blonde sound of a song like 'Loveless'. Harley however is too much of an original to get trapped in mere imitation."

Thom Jurek of AllMusic described Poetic Justice as "a very solid and subdued set for Harley" and "fine work top to bottom" which "should be owned by any fan, or investigated by the curious". Jurek wrote, "He's in fine voice here, and his own songs are pretty much top of the heap for having been some '20 years past his prime' as some jive Brit journo called him. It's nonsense, of course, since Harley may not have had the hits in the '90s, but certainly had the requisite taste, musicianship and elegance to put a collection of songs together like this one."

Track listing

Personnel
Credits are adapted from the Poetic Justice CD album booklet.

 Steve Harley – vocals
 Nick Pynn – acoustic guitar, 12-string guitar, dulcimer, mando-cello
 Phil Beer – electric guitar, acoustic guitar, bottle-neck guitar, violin, vocals
 Richard Durrant – classical guitar (track 10)
 Thomas Arnold – Hammond organ, piano, honky-tonk, percussion
 Ian Nice – piano, keyboards
 Andrew Brown – bass, double-bass
 Herbie Flowers – double-bass (track 5)
 Paul Francis – drums
 Mark Price – drums (tracks 5, 9)
 Susan Harvey – vocals

Production
 Steve Harley – producer
 Curtis Schwartz – engineer

Other
 Phil Nicholls – sleeve photography
 Chris Insoll – photo tinting
 Hugh Gilmour at Castle – design
 Steve Blackwell - representation
 James Wyllie – representation
 Paul Charles at Asgard – agency

References

1996 albums
Steve Harley albums
Transatlantic Records albums
Castle Communications albums